Milan Ivana (born 26 November 1983) is a Slovak former professional footballer who played as a winger or forward.

Honours
Slovakia U19
 UEFA European Under-19 Championship: third place 2002

External links
 
 
 

1983 births
Living people
People from Nové Mesto nad Váhom District
Sportspeople from the Trenčín Region
Slovak footballers
Association football midfielders
Slovakia international footballers
Slovakia youth international footballers
Slovak Super Liga players
Czech First League players
2. Bundesliga players
3. Liga players
Regionalliga players
Bundesliga players
AS Trenčín players
1. FC Slovácko players
SK Slavia Prague players
ŠK Slovan Bratislava players
SV Wehen Wiesbaden players
SV Darmstadt 98 players
SV Elversberg players
SV Röchling Völklingen players
Slovak expatriate footballers
Slovak expatriate sportspeople in the Czech Republic
Expatriate footballers in the Czech Republic
Slovak expatriate sportspeople in Germany
Expatriate footballers in Germany